My Life's Been a Country Song is the fourth studio album by American country music artist Chris Cagle. It was released on February 19, 2008, through Capitol Records Nashville. The album's lead-off single was "What Kinda Gone", which peaked at No. 3 on the country music charts in April 2008, the second single, "No Love Songs", peaked at No. 53, while the third single, "Never Ever Gone", failed to chart.

The album debuted at number eight on the U.S. Billboard 200 chart, selling about 37,000 copies in its first week. It also debuted at number one on Billboard's Top Country Albums chart. It is also Cagle's final album for Capitol.

The song "I Don't Wanna Live" was also recorded by Josh Gracin on his 2008 album We Weren't Crazy as "I Don't Want to Live". "Keep Me From Loving You" was also recorded by Clay Walker on his 2010 album, She Won't Be Lonely Long.

Track listing

Personnel
Credits adapted from AllMusic.

Vocals
 Chris Cagle - lead vocals 
 Perry Coleman – background vocals
 Harry Stinson – background vocals
 Russell Terrell – background vocals
 Neil Thrasher – background vocals

Musicians

 Tom Bukovac – electric guitar
 John Carroll – electric guitar
 Eric Darken – percussion
 Kenny Greenberg – electric guitar
 Mike Johnson – lap steel guitar, pedal steel guitar
 Troy Lancaster – electric guitar

 B. James Lowry – acoustic guitar
 Greg Morrow – drums, percussion
 Gordon Mote – piano, Hammond B-3 organ, Hammond organ
 Jimmie Lee Sloas – bass guitar
 Jonathan Yudkin – fiddle, mandolin, banjo

Production

Denise Arguijo – art direction 
Drew Bollman – assistant, engineer, mixing
Chris Cagle – audio production, producer
Joana Carter – art direction 
Mariana Chavez – photography 
Greg Droman – mixing 
Jedd Hackett – digital editing 
Michelle Hall — art direction 

Russ Harrington - photography 
Scott Hendricks – audio production, overdub engineer, producer 
John Netti – assistant 
Justin Niebank – engineer, mixing 
Lowell Reynolds – assistant 
Patrick Thrasher – digital editing 
Hank Williams - mastering

Chart performance

Weekly charts

Year-end charts

References

2008 albums
Albums produced by Scott Hendricks
Chris Cagle albums
Capitol Records Nashville albums